Thalassodes opalina is a species of moth of the  family Geometridae. It is found in Asia, where it is known from India, Thailand, Taiwan, and China.

References

Geometrinae
Moths described in 1880